The Oakland Hotel is a historic building in Oakland, California. It was built as a luxury hotel by P.J. Walker in 1912, with investments from businessmen Francis Marion Smith, Edson Adams and W.W. Garthwaite. From 1943 to 1963, it was a hospital for the United States Army and the United States Department of Veterans Affairs. It was subsequently unoccupied until at least the late 1970s.

The building was designed in the Renaissance Revival style by architect Henry Janeway Hardenbergh. It has been listed on the National Register of Historic Places since September 4, 1979.

References

Hotel buildings on the National Register of Historic Places in California
National Register of Historic Places in Alameda County, California
Renaissance Revival architecture in California
Hotel buildings completed in 1912
Veterans Affairs medical facilities